Pierre du Chastel or Duchâtel (died 1552) was a French humanist, librarian to Francis I of France.

Pierre Duchâtel [Du Chastel, Castellanus, or Pierre Castellan], was chaplain to François I, scholar, bishop of Tulle and Mâcon, Master of the King's Bookshop and director of the Royal College (now Collège de France). He was born in Arc-en-Barrois around 1480, He died of apoplexy in Orléans on February 3, 1552 while preaching.

References

Year of birth unknown
1552 deaths
French librarians
Bishops of Tulle